Ricardo "Ric" Manrique Jr. (23 May 1941 – 22 September 2017) was a Filipino Kundiman singer. He was known as one of the two Hari Ng Kundiman (Kings of Kundiman) in the Philippines, alongside Ruben Tagalog.

Early career
He was a member of the Mabuhay Singers in the 1950s. He recorded his first album in the early 1960s and recorded most of his songs with Villar Records.

Later Career & Solo Career
Manrique was best known for his songs that became theme songs of popular Filipino movies. The song entitled as Ang Daigdig Ko'y Ikaw is the theme song from the 1965 movie of the same title starring Fernando Poe Jr. and Susan Roces. It was sung in collaboration with Pilita Corrales.

Death
Manrique died on September 22, 2017 in California, United States.

Discography 

Villar International Music Publishing:
 1995: D'yos Lamang Ang Nakakaalam
 1997: Kundiman
 2007: Ang Pasko ay Pag-ibig
 2009: Ric Manrique Jr. Sings Ilocano Songs
 2010: Sa Piling Mo
 2010: Dahil Sa Isang Bulaklak
 2013: Magbalik Ka Lamang

References

External links 
 

1941 births
2017 deaths
20th-century Filipino male singers